The following is a timeline of the history of the city of Varna, Bulgaria.

Prior to 20th century

 6th century BCE – Odessus founded by Greeks.
 1st century CE – Romans in power.
 1201 – Siege of Varna (1201) by forces of Kaloyan of Bulgaria.
 1389 – Ottoman Turks in power.

 1444 – 10 November: Battle of Varna.
 1606 – Varna sacked by Cossacks.
 1828 – Siege of Varna.
 1854 – During Crimean War, allied forces based temporarily at Varna.
 1867 – Rustchuk–Varna railway begins operating.
 1870 – Seat of a Bulgarian Bishop.
 1871 – Slavic Orthodox Christian  established.
 1878 – Varna becomes part of newly restored independent Bulgaria per Treaty of Berlin (1878)
 1883 – Orient Express railway begins operating.
 1885 – Euxinograd palace built near Varna.
 1886 – Dormition of the Mother of God Cathedral, Varna built.
 1888
 Varna Archaeological Museum founded.
 Population: 25,256.
 1892 – Bulgarian Steamship Company in business.
 1900 – Machine School for the Navy relocated to Varna.

20th century

 1906
 Port of Varna built.
 Population: 37,155.
 1912 –  becomes mayor.
 1913 – Reka Ticha sport club formed.
 1915 – 27 October: Varna bombed by Russian forces.
 1916 – 16 January: Varna bombed by Russian forces.
 1918 – SC Sokol (football club) formed.
 1921 – Stoyan Bachvarov Dramatic Theatre founded.
 1923 – BC Cherno More basketball team founded.
 1925 – Varna railway station opens.
 1931 – Freedom begins publication.
 1932 – Varna Aquarium opens.
 1934
  begins broadcasting.
 City becomes capital of Varna oblast.
 1935
 Symbolic mausoleum of King Władysław III of Poland erected.
  becomes mayor.
 1946 – Population: 77,792.
 1949
 Varna renamed "Stalin."
 City becomes capital of the Stalin District.
 1950 – Yuri Gagarin Stadium opens.
 1957 – In vicinity of Varna, Golden Sands resort development begins.
 1961
 Institute of Medicine established.
 Sea Garden (Varna) remodelled.
 1962 – 15th Chess Olympiad held in Varna.
 1964
 Varna International Ballet Competition begins.
 Population: 172,700.
 John Hunyadi monument unveiled.

 1968 – Ticha Stadium and Palace of Culture and Sports open.
 1970 – Varna co-hosts the 1970 FIVB Volleyball Women's World Championship.
 1972 – Varna Necropolis discovered.
 1974 – Varna hosts the 1974 World Artistic Gymnastics Championships.
 1976 – Asparuhov Bridge opens.
 1979 – Varna hosts the 1979 European Weightlifting Championships.
 1981 – Varna co-hosts the 1981 Men's European Volleyball Championship.
 1985
 Museum of Medicine History opened.
 BC Cherno More wins its first Bulgarian basketball championship.
 1986 – Trolleybuses begin operating.
 1991 – Hristo Borisov Hall (sport arena) opens.
 1993 – Population: 307,200 city; 313,034 urban agglomeration (estimate).
 1994 – McDonald's in business.
 1998 – Black Sea NGO Network headquartered in Varna.

21st century

 2001
 Varna co-hosts the 2001 Women's European Volleyball Championship.
 Population: 314,539.
 2008
 Mall Varna (shopping centre) in business.
 New Varna Stadium construction begins.
 2011 – Population: 343,704 municipality.
 2013
 2013 Bulgarian protests against the first Borisov cabinet.
 2013–14 Bulgarian protests against the Oresharski cabinet.
 Air pollution in Varna reaches annual mean of 36 PM2.5 and 51 PM10, more than recommended.
  becomes mayor.
 2014 – June: 2014 Bulgarian floods.
 2018 – Varna co-hosts the 2018 FIVB Volleyball Men's World Championship.
 2021 – Varna hosts the 2021 Rhythmic Gymnastics European Championships.

See also
 Varna history
 
 List of mayors of Varna
 List of oldest buildings in Varna
 Timelines of other cities in Bulgaria: Plovdiv, Sofia

References

This article incorporates information from the Bulgarian Wikipedia.

Bibliography

Published in 19th century
 
 
 
 
 
 

Published in 20th century

External links

varna
Varna
Bulgaria history-related lists
Years in Bulgaria